Avdotyino is a rural locality (a village) in Yamkinskoye Rural Settlement of Noginsky District, Moscow Oblast, Russia. The population was 820 as of 2010. There are 14 streets.

Geography 
Avdotyino is located 22 km northwest of Noginsk (the district's administrative centre) by road. Pyatkovo is the nearest rural locality.

References 

Rural localities in Moscow Oblast
Populated places in Noginsky District